Kelly Jo Minter (born July 14, 1966) is an American actress. Minter made her acting debut as "The Pilot" in an after-school short movie of the same name in 1984. She made her film debut as Lorrie in Mask (1985). She subsequently portrayed Denise Green in Summer School (1987), Maria in The Lost Boys (1987), Charlotta in Miracle Mile (1988), Yvonne Miller in A Nightmare on Elm Street 5: The Dream Child (1989), LaDonna in House Party (1990), Cheryl in Popcorn (1991), and Ruby Williams in The People Under the Stairs (1991). Outside of film, Kelly has made guest appearances on a variety of television series including Hill Street Blues (1987), A Different World (1988), Martin (1993), ER (1996), Providence (2001), and Strong Medicine (2002). In 2010, she appeared as herself in the documentary Never Sleep Again: The Elm Street Legacy.

Early life
Minter was the youngest of nine children in a middle-class, Catholic household. Due to her mother, a pharmaceutical supplies salesperson traveling for work, Minter left home at age 14 to live on her own, before ending up in juvenile hall and girls homes.

Career
Minter began her career in entertainment behind the scenes as a Grip on mainstream and pornographic films. It led her to getting onscreen acting roles in film and television.

In 1982, Minter portrayed Angela in an episode of the third season of Fame called "Break Dance". In 1984, she portrayed Carla in the television short The Pilot. In 1985, Minter made her film acting debut as the prostitute Lorrie in the drama film Mask. She starred alongside Cher, Sam Elliott, and Eric Stoltz. The film earned positive reviews and was a financial success. The same year, she portrayed Kelly on an episode of the television series T.J. Hooker called "Street Bait" and Rachel Torres in the television film Badge of the Assassin.

In 1986, Minter portrayed Toni in the television film Charley Hannah and Vicky in an episode of Walt Disney's Wonderful World of Color called "The Deacon Street Deer". In 1987, Minter portrayed Kathy in an episode of Hill Street Blues called "It Ain't Over Till It's Over" and Denise Green, a dyslexic teenager, in the comedy film Summer School. For her work in this film, Minter received an NAACP Image Award nomination for Outstanding Supporting Actress in a Motion Picture in 1987. The same year, Minter portrayed Maria in Joel Schumacher's cult horror comedy film The Lost Boys. She subsequently portrayed Treena Lester in The Principal. The following year, she portrayed Charlotta in Steve De Jarnatt's apocalyptic thriller Miracle Mile and Charisse in two episodes of the television series A Different World.

In 1989, Minter portrayed Yvonne Miller in Stephen Hopkins' fantasy horror film A Nightmare on Elm Street 5: The Dream Child. She starred alongside Lisa Wilcox as Alice Johnson and Robert Englund as Freddy Krueger. The same year, she portrayed Loret in the film Cat Chaser. The following year, Minter was cast as LaDonna in Reginald Hudlin's comedy film House Party. In 1991, she portrayed a recovering drug addict in New Jack City, Cheryl in Popcorn, Mulready in Doc Hollywood, and Ruby Williams in Wes Craven's The People Under the Stairs. The same year, she had guest appearances on a variety of television series such as Father Dowling Mysteries, WIOU, and Sibs.

In 1992, Minter portrayed Sharonda in the television film Murder Without Motive: The Edmund Perry Story. The following year, she portrayed Joanna in the film Sunset Grill and Rhodesia in an episode of Martin. In 1994, she appeared in the television film Cosmic Slop. In 1996, she portrayed a hooker in The Rich Man's Wife, a crack mom in an episode of ER, and Rita in the television film A Face to Die For. The following year, she portrayed Chrissie Brooks in Dead Men Can't Dance.

In 2001, Minter starred in the television film Stranger Inside and had a guest appearance in the televisions series Providence. The following year, she portrayed Vielle Montoya in an episode of Strong Medicine. In 2003, she portrayed Angie in the film Tapped Out. In 2008, she portrayed Karen in an episode of Zoey 101. In 2010, Minter appeared as herself in the documentary Never Sleep Again: The Elm Street Legacy. In 2012, she appeared as herself in the documentary After the Violence.

Personal life
Minter has been married to singer-songwriter Georgio Allentini since 1992. Together they have three sons, Georgio Allentini Jr. (b. September 1987), Joseph and Christian Allentini (b. December 1997).

Filmography

Film

Television

References

External links

1966 births
Actresses from New Jersey
American film actresses
American television actresses
Actors from Trenton, New Jersey
African-American actresses
Living people
21st-century African-American people
21st-century African-American women
20th-century African-American people
20th-century African-American women